The following is a timeline of the history of the city of Lubumbashi, Democratic Republic of the Congo.

20th century

1900s-1950s
 1909
 1 September: Elisabethville site designated seat of Katanga province; named after Elisabeth of Bavaria, Queen of Belgium.
 27 September:  begins operating.
 1910 
 Union Minière du Haut Katanga (mining entity) active.
  (hospital) and Catholic Apostolic Prefecture of Katanga established.
 Population: 360.
 Émile Wangermée becomes vice governor-general of Katanga.
 1910s - "Governor's Residence and Imara and Twendelee schools" built.
 1911
 Journal du Katanga newspaper begins publication.
 Population: 1,000.
 Etoile mining begins near Elisabethville.
 Catholic schools Institut Marie-José and Collège Saint-François de Sales established.(fr)
 1912
 Racially segregated "native city" established per ordinance.
 Elisabethville becomes seat of Upper Luapula district.
 1918 -  begins operating.
 1919
 Population: 8,000 (approximate).
 Ruashi mining begins in vicinity of Elisabethville.
 1920
 "Management of the Union Minière was transferred from the British to the Belgians."
 Catholic Sts. Peter and Paul Cathedral built.
 1920s - "Makutano Club, Jerusalem United Methodist Church, and the Jewish synagogue" built.
 1921 - Development of Albert I township begins.
 1928
  begins operating.
 L'Essor du Congo newspaper begins publication.
 1930s- "Courthouse and Mazembe stadium" built.
 1931 - L'Écho du Katanga newspaper begins publication.
 1932 - Wallace Memorial Church built.
 1937 -  (museum) founded.
 1939 - Football clubs FC Saint-Éloi Lupopo and FC Saint-Georges formed.
 1941
 Elisabethville attains city status.
 Development of Kenya township begins.
 1944 - Premiere of Joseph Kiwele's Cantate à la gloire de la Belgique.
 1945 - Union Africaine des Arts et Lettres founded.
 1946 - Académie d'Art Populaire d'Elisabethville founded.
 1949 - Athénée royal built.
 1950 - Development of Katuba township begins.
 1950s - "Post office,...CSK headquarters, the theater, St. Mary's Basilica, and the railway headquarters" built.
 1951 - Académie des Beaux-Arts d'Elisabethville founded.
 1954
 Development of Ruashi township begins.
 City seal in use.
 1956 - Université officielle du Congo et du Rwanda-Urundi opens.
 1957
 City "divided into 5 communes, one for Europeans and 4 for Africans."
 December:  held.
 1959
 Roman Catholic Archdiocese of Elisabethville established.
 Population: 183,711 (estimate).

1960s-1990s
 1960
 June: City becomes part of independent Republic of the Congo.
 July: City becomes capital of breakaway State of Katanga during the Congo Crisis.
  becomes bourgmestre (mayor).
 1960s - "Gecamines tower and the 2 hospitals" built.
 1961 - 15 September: Airport bombed by Katangese Air Force.
 1963 -  newspaper begins publication.
 1964 - Stade Albert (stadium) opens.
 1966 - City becomes capital of Katanga Province.
 1967
 La Générale des Carrières et des Mines (mining entity) headquartered in city.
  opens.
 1970
 Elisabethville renamed "Lubumbashi."
  (museum) active.
 1970s - "Hotel Karavia and Mobutu Stadium" built.
 1971 - City becomes part of Shaba Province in the Republic of Zaire.
 1972
 Kampemba commune created.
 University's Centre d'études des littératures romanes d'inspiration africaine active.
 1974 - Société nationale des Chemins de fer du Congo (national railway) headquartered in Lubumbashi.
 1975 - Population: 480,875 (estimate).
 1977 -  created.
 1981 - University of Lubumbashi active.
 1984 - Population: 543,268.
 1990 - May: Student demonstration at University of Lubumbashi; crackdown.
 1994 - Population: 851,381 (estimate).
 1997
 April: Alliance of Democratic Forces for the Liberation of Congo take city during the First Congo War.
 Floribert Kaseba Makunko becomes mayor.
 May: City becomes part of Democratic Republic of the Congo.

21st century
 2007 - Moïse Katumbi becomes governor of Katanga Province.
 2008 -  becomes mayor.
 2010
  becomes mayor.
 Congo Express airline (Kinshasa-Lubumbashi) begins operating.
 Centennial of founding of city.
 2011
 February: Airport attacked by secessionist Tigers.
 June: Unrest.
 7 September: Prison break; escapees include warlord Gédéon Kyungu.
 Stade TP Mazembe (stadium) opens in Kamalondo.
 2013 - March: Secessionist Mai-Mai Kata Katanga unrest.
 2014 - January: Mai-Mai Kata Katanga unrest.
 2015
 City becomes capital of the newly formed Haut-Katanga Province.
 Population: 2,015,502 (estimate).
 2016 - December: Political protest.

See also
 Lubumbashi#History
 
 List of cities in the Democratic Republic of the Congo
 Timeline of Bukavu
 Timeline of Goma
 Timeline of Kinshasa
 Timeline of Kisangani

References

Bibliography

in English

in French

External links
  (Bibliography)
  (Bibliography)
  (Images, etc.)
  (Images, etc.)
  (Bibliography)
  (Bibliography)
  (Bibliography) (see also "Elisabethville")

Images

Lubumbashi
Lubumbashi
History of the Democratic Republic of the Congo
Democratic Republic of the Congo history-related lists
Years in the Democratic Republic of the Congo